HTTP authentication may refer to:

 Basic access authentication
 Digest access authentication